Western College for Women, known at other times as Western Female Seminary, The Western and simply Western College, was a women's and later coed liberal arts college in Oxford, Ohio, between 1855 and 1974. Initially a seminary, it was the host of orientation sessions for the Freedom Summer in 1964. It was absorbed by Miami University in 1974 after dwindling finances. Now known as the Western Campus of Miami University, it was designated a U.S. Historic district known as the Western Female Seminary Historic District in 1979.

History

Western College was founded in 1853 as Western Female Seminary.  It was a daughter school of Mount Holyoke College in South Hadley, Massachusetts, and its first principal, Helen Peabody, was a Holyoke graduate. The college changed its name three times, in 1894 to The Western: A College and Seminary for Women, in 1904 to Western College for Women, and in 1971 to The Western College when the institution became coeducational.

Western remained an independent women's college until 1970 when it formed a "committee of cooperation" with the adjacent Miami University, which opened enrollment between the colleges on a limited basis.  This allowed Western students to take classes at Miami and use Miami's computer and hospital facilities, for example, while allowing Miami students access to intramural fields, library space, and cross-country runways on Western grounds.  Before the 1973–74 school years, both presidents signed an agreement for an affiliation between the two schools.  In 1974, Western became part of Miami due to financial difficulties.

On September 17, 1979, 15 buildings and 11 structures from the former Western College were designated the Western Female Seminary Historic District.

Civil Rights Movement

In June 1964, an orientation and training in nonviolence techniques was held on the campus of Western College for Women for volunteers heading south to Mississippi for Freedom Summer. While training at Western was still on-going, Mickey Schwerner, a veteran civil rights worker who had come to Oxford to help train the new recruits, received word that one of the churches that had agreed to host Freedom Summer activities had been attacked and burned. Schwerner and Andrew Goodman, a new volunteer, left Oxford immediately to head back to Mississippi.  Schwerner's wife, Rita, remained behind at Western College to finish the training. Within days, Schwerner and Goodman, along with James Chaney, a native Mississippian and voting rights activist, were reported missing in Philadelphia, Mississippi. Their bodies were found months later, buried in an earthen dam. Public uproar over these murders helped pass the Civil Rights Act of 1964 and the Voting Rights Act a few months later. A memorial tribute to the Freedom Summer activists was recently dedicated on the Western College campus.

Western today
In 1974, the Western College for Women merged with Miami University and became the Western College Program (School of Interdisciplinary Studies). In 2007, the Western College Program was integrated into the College of Arts and Sciences and is now known as the Western Program for Individualized Studies at Miami University.

Of the original Western College buildings, Boyd Hall, Clawson Hall, Hoyt Library, Kumler Chapel, McKee Hall, Thomson Hall, and Peabody Hall were retained as either academic building or dormitories. Since the merger, four new dormitories and a dining hall were also added to the Western Campus.

Notable alumnae

 Margaret Caroline Anderson (1886–1973), founder-editor The Little Review 
 Edith Evans Asbury, journalist
 Esin Atıl, curator
 Robin L. Bartlett, economist
 Mary Letitia Caldwell, winner of the Garvan Medal for chemistry
 Penny Colman, author
 Eliza Calvert Hall, author and suffragist
 Sarah Jane Dawes Shedd, missionary in Persia
 Natalie de Blois, architect
 Ameerah Haq, Under-Secretary-General of the United Nations
 Mary Garrett Hay (1857–1928), suffragist and community organizer
 Dorothy Misener Jurney, the "godmother of women's pages"
 Helene Mambu, Congolese physician and International Public Health Expert
 Nancy Barr Mavity, crime mystery writer
 Ann Marcus, television writer
 Pamela Mboya, Kenyan representative, UN-Habitat
 Gladys Milligan (1892–1973), painter
 Hank Phillippi Ryan, reporter and novelist
 Donna Shalala, former member of the U.S. House of Representatives, 5th president of University of Miami (Florida); 18th United States Secretary of Health and Human Services
 Sylvia Stanfield, diplomat
 Maliha Zulfacar, professor and Afghan ambassador to Germany
 Ester Neira de Calvo, educator, feminist and women's right advocate.
 Greta Pope, vocalist and vocal coach

See also
 List of current and historical women's universities and colleges
 Alumnae Hall (Western College for Women)
 Hoyt Hall (Miami, Ohio)
 Kumler Chapel
 Langstroth Cottage
 Mary Lyon Residence Hall
 Peabody Hall (Miami University)

References

External links
Western History from Ohiohistorycentral.org
Western Female Seminary records, 1863-1973
The Western Round-Up Student Newspaper

Educational institutions established in 1855
Defunct private universities and colleges in Ohio
Miami University
Former women's universities and colleges in the United States
Embedded educational institutions
Education in Butler County, Ohio
Women in Ohio
1855 establishments in Ohio
1974 disestablishments in Ohio
Educational institutions disestablished in 1974
Historic districts on the National Register of Historic Places in Ohio
National Register of Historic Places in Butler County, Ohio